Somerset Holmes was a 6-issue comic book mini-series written by Bruce Jones and co-plotted by April Campbell with art by Brent Anderson. The first four issues were published by Pacific Comics; after Pacific went out of business the last two issues were published by Eclipse Comics which later collected all six issues into a trade paperback. The first issue of Somerset Holmes was cover dated September 1983, the last December 1984.

Somerset Holmes tells the story of an amnesiac young woman, chased by criminals intent on killing her, and her attempts to stay alive while simultaneously struggling to solve the mystery of her past life and true identity. She takes her assumed name, Somerset Holmes, from a sign advertising a housing project, Somerset Homes.

The physical appearance of the main character was based on author Jones' wife April Campbell, a former model, who posed as photo reference for the character, including the image used for the first issue's cover.

The series was a deliberate attempt to create a comics property that could then be sold to Hollywood as a movie, and the storyline, panel arrangements and scene angles were consciously cinematic. Somerset Holmes, although never made into a movie, was actually optioned by Ed Pressman and, because of the screenplay Jones and Campbell wrote for it, both gained Hollywood agents and were accepted into the Screen Writers Guild. They subsequently worked on television and movie projects, as well as more comic books, and both went on to write novels.

Both Jones and Campbell feel strongly that the 1996 Geena Davis movie The Long Kiss Goodnight was an unauthorized, and unpaid for, theft of the Somerset Holmes idea.

References

1983 comics debuts
Pacific Comics titles
Eclipse Comics titles
Sherlock Holmes pastiches
Detective comics